Yuan Xinyi may refer to:

 Yuen Shun-yi or Yuan Xinyi, Chinese actor and stunt coordinator
 Xinyi Yuan, Chinese mathematician